Skeith can mean:

 Skeith, a Neopet
 Skeith (.hack), a fictional character from the .hack franchise.